Sun Down Lady is the debut album by Lani Hall.

Track listing

Side One
"Love Song" (Lesley Duncan) 2:55
"Tiny Dancer" (Elton John, Bernie Taupin) 4:06
"How Can I Tell You" (Cat Stevens) 2:56
"You" (Lani Hall) 3:58
"Ocean Song" (Liz Thorsen) 3:40

Side Two
"We Could Be Flying" (Michel Colombier, Paul Williams) 3:53
"Come Down in Time" (Elton John, Bernie Taupin) 3:39
"Sun Down" (Willis Alan Ramsey) 3:30
"Vincent" (Don McLean) 5:55
"Wherever I May Find Him" (Paul Simon) 1:53

The track "Sun Down" is a rewritten version of the song better known as "Muskrat Love", a hit for America and Captain & Tennille.

Personnel
Lani Hall - vocals
Clarence McDonald - keyboards
Jim Gordon - drums
Chuck Domanico - bass
Louis Shelton - guitar
Larry Carlton - guitar
Milt Holland - percussion
Pete Jolly - accordion on “How Can I Tell You”
Tim Weisberg - electric flute on “Ocean Song”
Herb Alpert - vocals

References

1972 debut albums
Albums produced by Herb Alpert
Lani Hall albums
A&M Records albums
Albums recorded at A&M Studios